Leucine-rich repeat-containing G-protein coupled receptor 4 is a protein that in humans is encoded by the LGR4 gene. LGR4 is known to have a role in the development of the male reproductive tract, eyelids, hair and bone.

Mutations in this gene have been associated to osteoporosis (doi:10.1038/nature12124).

References

Further reading

G protein-coupled receptors